is a railway station in the city of  Nikaho, Akita, Japan, operated by JR East.

Lines
Nikaho Station is served by the Uetsu Main Line, and is located 214.7 km from the terminus of the line at Niitsu Station.

Station layout
The station consists of one side platform and one island platform  connected to the station building by a footbridge. The station is attended.

Platforms

History
The station was renamed Nikaho Station on April 1, 1968. With the privatization of JNR on April 1, 1987, the station came under the control of JR East. A new station building was completed in June 2001.

Passenger statistics
In fiscal 2018, the station was used by an average of 261 passengers daily (boarding passengers only).

Surrounding area
 Nikaho city office
 Nikaho Post office
 TDK Hirasawa Plant
 Nikaho Green Field

References

External links

 JR East Station information 

Railway stations in Japan opened in 1922
Railway stations in Akita Prefecture
Uetsu Main Line
Nikaho, Akita